Santelmoa is a genus of marine ray-finned fishes belongong to the family Zoarcidae, the eelpouts. The species in this genus are found in the Antarctic in the Southern Ocean and Atlantic Ocean.

Species
Santelmoa contains 4 species:

References

Lycodinae